"Five Hours" is a 2014 single by Mexican-American DJ Deorro and has appeared in a great number of dance compilations in 2014. The song charted in a number of countries and notably reached number 8 on SNEP official French Singles Chart. In the United States, the single reached number one on Billboards Dance/Mix Show Airplay chart in its 6 September 2014 issue, giving Deorro his first number-one single and his debuted single in his home country. The American version that was first released featured vocals by DyCy and charted as "Five Hours (Don't Hold Me Back)". Later, a third vocal version entitled "Five More Hours" was released and was successful in the charts.

Track listing

Charts and certifications

Weekly charts

Year-end charts

Certifications

Five More Hours

Deorro released a third version of "Five Hours" and vocals from American singer Chris Brown titled "Five More Hours". It was released as a digital download in the United States on 3 March 2015.

Music video
On 30 April 2015, an official music video for the third version was released. It was directed by Andrew Sandler and was filmed in California. The video also features rapper Travi$ Scott. The video shows Brown and Scott on their way to Coachella to premiere Brown's vocal mix of Deorro's Five Hours. Brown's car breaks down in the desert and he holds a party in a school bus, driven by Deorro, on his way to the concert.

Track listing

Charts and certifications

Weekly charts

Year-end charts

Certifications

Release history

References

2014 songs
2014 singles
2015 singles
Deorro songs
Chris Brown songs
Number-one singles in Scotland
Songs written by Chris Brown
Songs written by Julian Bunetta
Songs written by John Ryan (musician)
Electronic dance music songs